Yarriabini National Park is a protected area of 2092 hectares, situated in the Mid North Coast region of New South Wales. The nearest large town is Macksville. The high rainfall and relatively fertile soils produce outstanding eucalyptus forest and rainforest. Large rose gum and hoop pine grow in sheltered areas. "Yarriabini" is said to mean "koala rolling".

The elevation of the terrain is 354 meters.

Climate 
Summer temperature averages range from 18°C to 27°C, and winter range from 11°C and 19°C.

See also
 Protected areas of New South Wales

References 

National parks of New South Wales
Forests of New South Wales
2003 establishments in Australia
Mid North Coast